Agatha Chrystenzen Fernandez Wong is a Filipino wushu athlete who has won medals for the Philippines at the Southeast Asian Games, Asian Games, and the World Wushu Championships.

Early life and education
Agatha Chrystenzen Fernandez Wong was born on May 20, 1998 in Quezon City, Philippines, tracing her roots to Dagupan, Pangasinan. Her father, Christopher Wong Sr. is Filipino-Chinese, while her mother, Richa Agatha Wong (née Fernandez) is Filipino-American. Wong also has a younger brother and sister. At a young age, she was encouraged to try various sports including swimming, karate, and wushu.

Wong studied at the College of Holy Spirit in Quezon City and the De La Salle-College of St. Benilde where she graduated with a Bachelor of Arts in Consular and Diplomatic Affairs.

Career
Specalizing in taolu, Wong has been a wushu athlete since she was 8 years old.

She won her first medal in an international competition at the 2013 Asian Junior Wushu Championships in Makati, Philippines by besting the under-15 women's 32 form taijiquan of the Taolu competitions. She won two medals (gold in Taijijian and bronze in Taijiquan) in the following edition held in Inner Mongolia, China.

Wong won a bronze medal at the 2018 Asian Games held in Jakarta–Palembang despite the Wushu delegation experiencing financial issues which prevented her from training in China, as customarily done for high-profile competitions. She also sustained a grade 2 slipped disc injury prior to the games and has not yet fully recovered by the time she competed in the continental competition.

At the 2018 Asian Traditional Wushu Championships in Nanjing, China, Wong clinched two medals for the Philippines by besting the Group B women's Taijijian and Group B women's Taijiquan events

Wong also competed at the 2017 and 2019 Southeast Asian Games; clinching the gold medal for the taijiquan event and silver for taijijian at the 2017 SEA Games in Kuala Lumpur, Malaysia, and two gold medals for the taijiquan and taijijian events at the 2019 SEA Games in the Philippines.

References

Medalists at the 2018 Asian Games
Filipino wushu practitioners
Wushu practitioners at the 2018 Asian Games
Asian Games medalists in wushu
Asian Games bronze medalists for the Philippines
Filipino people of Chinese descent
People from Dagupan
De La Salle–College of Saint Benilde alumni
1998 births
Living people
Southeast Asian Games gold medalists for the Philippines
Southeast Asian Games silver medalists for the Philippines
Competitors at the 2017 Southeast Asian Games
Competitors at the 2019 Southeast Asian Games
Tai chi practitioners
Competitors at the 2021 Southeast Asian Games